Stories and Songs is a spoken word children's album, released in 1993 by Australian-based artist, Franciscus Henri, under ABC Music's ABC for Kids label on compact disc.

Track listing
All tracks written by Franciscus Henri
 "Go Wrong Day" / "The Awful Adventures of Andy the Angry Ant" / "Go Wrong Day": – 18:14
 "Long Way to Go" / "Benjamin Snail's Christmas" / "Away in a Manger" / "Long Way to Go": – 17:13

References

1993 albums
Franciscus Henri albums
1990s spoken word albums